Maxim Gorky wrote three autobiographical works, namely My Childhood, In the World and My Universities. These were often published under the title  Autobiography of Maxim Gorky or simply as Autobiography and mentioned as "the autobiographical series" and My Childhood. In the World. My Universities. 

The first part of Gorky's autobiography, My Childhood, was published in Russian in 1913–14, and in English in 1915. It was republished by Pocket Penguins in 2016.

The second part, In the World (also translated as My Apprenticeship) was published in 1916.

The third part, My Universities appeared in 1923.

Screen adaptation 
 The Childhood of Maxim Gorky, Gorky 2: My Apprenticeship, Gorky 3: My Universities, films by Mark Donskoy.

References

External links
 My Childhood at the Internet Archive 
 In the World at the Internet Archive 
 My Universities at the Internet Archive 

 
Russian autobiographies
1914 books
1915 books
1923 books
Works by Maxim Gorky